Attica is a village in Seneca County, Ohio, United States. The population was 899 at the 2010 census.

Attica was designated a Tree City USA by the National Arbor Day Foundation.

History
Attica was named after Attica, New York, the hometown of a pioneer settler.

Geography

Attica is located at  (41.064826, -82.884790).

Demographics

2010 census
As of the census of 2010, there were 899 people, 364 households, and 266 families living in the village. The racial makeup of the village was 96.3% White, 0.8% African American, 0.2% from other races, and 2.7% from two or more races. Hispanic or Latino of any race were 1.3% of the population.

There were 364 households, of which 33.8% had children under the age of 18 living with them, 54.9% were married couples living together, 15.1% had a female householder with no husband present, 3.0% had a male householder with no wife present, and 26.9% were non-families. 25.0% of all households were made up of individuals, and 12.1% had someone living alone who was 65 years of age or older. The average household size was 2.47 and the average family size was 2.88.

The median age in the village was 39.8 years. 25.6% of residents were under the age of 18; 7.8% were between the ages of 18 and 24; 22% were from 25 to 44; 27.1% were from 45 to 64; and 17.5% were 65 years of age or older. The gender makeup of the village was 48.8% male and 51.2% female.

2000 census
As of the census of 2000, there were 955 people, 393 households, and 277 families living in the village. The population density was 1,783.4 people per square mile (682.8/km2). There were 430 housing units at an average density of 803.0 per square mile (307.5/km2). The racial makeup of the village was 98.95% White, 0.21% Native American, 0.10% from other races, and 0.73% from two or more races. Hispanic or Latino of any race were 0.42% of the population.

There were 393 households, out of which 29.3% had children under the age of 18 living with them, 57.8% were married couples living together, 10.2% had a female householder with no husband present, and 29.5% were non-families. 25.4% of all households were made up of individuals, and 10.9% had someone living alone who was 65 years of age or older. The average household size was 2.43 and the average family size was 2.91.

In the village, the population was spread out, with 23.8% under the age of 18, 9.1% from 18 to 24, 27.0% from 25 to 44, 23.8% from 45 to 64, and 16.3% who were 65 years of age or older. The median age was 38 years. For every 100 females there were 89.5 males. For every 100 females age 18 and over, there were 91.6 males.

The median income for a household in the village was $38,529, and the median income for a family was $44,408. Males had a median income of $37,833 versus $22,969 for females. The per capita income for the village was $17,942. About 8.6% of families and 9.8% of the population were below the poverty line, including 9.4% of those under age 18 and 6.3% of those age 65 or over.

Education
Attica is in the Seneca East Local School District, which includes Seneca East High School.  Until consolidation with Republic into Seneca East, the village was served by the Attica School District.

References

External links

Seneca East Local Schools
Seneca East Public Library
Attica Historical Society
The Attica Hub
Attica Independent Fair
Oak Ridge Festival
Attica Raceway Park

Villages in Seneca County, Ohio
Villages in Ohio